DeHuff is a surname. Notable people with the surname include:

 Elizabeth Willis DeHuff (1886–1983) American educator, important contributor to the development of Native American easel painting in the 1920s and 1930s.
 Nicole DeHuff (1975–2005) American actress

See also 
 Huff (surname)